Kennedy Mills may refer to:

Kennedy Mills, New Jersey
Kennedy House and Mill, listed on the NRHP in Warren County, New Jersey
Kennedy Mills, New York

McConnel & Kennedy Mills, cotton mills in Manchester, England